This page lists previous rosters of UCI Women's team Top Girls Fassa Bortolo.

2015
As of 10 March 2015. Ages as of 1 January 2015.

2014

2013
Ages as of 1 January 2013.

2012
Ages as of 1 January 2012.

2011
Ages as of 1 January 2011.

References

Lists of cyclists by team